"Little Girl (You're My Miss America)" is a song written by Vincent Catalano and Herb Alpert. It was first recorded by Dante & His Friends; The Beach Boys recording for their 1962 album Surfin' Safari is much better known. The song is known by various names, including "Miss America" and "Little Miss America".

Composition
"Little Girl" is a simple song about a teenager's infatuation with a girl. Unlike the other Beach Boys covers from this era, Brian Wilson changed the form of the song quite a bit, making adaptations and rearranging the song to make it more suited to The Beach Boys.

The Beach Boys version
The Beach Boys recorded this song on September 5, 1962, at their second Capitol Records recording session. It is Dennis Wilson's first lead vocal.

Personnel
Mike Love – vocals
David Marks – guitar
Brian Wilson – bass guitar, vocals
Carl Wilson – guitar, vocals
Dennis Wilson – drums, lead vocal

Notes

1962 songs
The Beach Boys songs
Song recordings produced by Nick Venet